Postphonic Star Exploration is one of many EPs Man or Astro-man? released in 1995. It is a 5"  record (smaller than the standard 7") and was released on black vinyl and clear green vinyl through Sympathy for the Record Industry.

Track listing
Alpha: "Polaris"
Beta: "War of the Satellites"

Line up
Captain Zeno
Birdstuff
Star Crunch
CoCo the Electronic Monkey Wizard

Man or Astro-man? EPs
1995 EPs
Sympathy for the Record Industry EPs